Watauga County is a county located in the U.S. state of North Carolina. As of the 2020 census, the population was 54,086. Its county seat and largest town is Boone. The county is in an exceptionally mountainous region. It is the home of Appalachian State University, which has approximately 20,023 students as of August 20, 2020. Watauga County comprises the Boone, NC Micropolitan Statistical Area.

History
The county was formed in 1849 from parts of Ashe, Caldwell, Wilkes, and Yancey counties. It was named for the Watauga River, whose name is said to be a Native American word. Meanings include "beautiful water," "whispering waters," "village of many springs," and "river of islands."

Geography

Watauga County is extremely mountainous, and all of the county's terrain is located within the Appalachian Mountains range. Boone, the county's largest city and county seat, has the highest elevation (3,333 feet) of any city over 10,000 population in the Eastern United States.

Isolated by mountainous terrain from the remainder of North Carolina to the east, Watauga County was described in the 19th and early 20th centuries as one of the Lost Provinces of North Carolina.

National protected areas
 Blue Ridge Parkway (part)
 Cherokee National Forest (part)

State and local protected areas 
 Beech Creek Bog State Natural Area
 Elk Knob State Park (part)
 Foscoe Grandfather Community Center
 Grandfather Mountain State Park (part)
 Green Valley Community Park
 Julian Price Memorial Park
 Moses H. Cone Memorial Park
 Turtle Island Preserve

Major water bodies 
 Buckeye Creek
 Craborchard Creek
 Howard Creek
 Laurel Creek
 Meadow Creek
 North Fork New River
 Sharp Creek
 South Fork New River
 Watauga River
 Yadkin River

Adjacent counties
 Ashe County - northeast
 Wilkes County - east
 Caldwell County - south
 Avery County - southwest
 Johnson County, Tennessee - northwest

Climate
As with most of North Carolina's High Country, the climate of Watauga County is that of a Humid continental climate, characterized by considerably cooler and more extreme weather than in other parts of the state. Dramatic and unexpected changes in the weather are not uncommon in the county, particularly for precipitation. This is partly due to the elevation of the county, and partly due to orographic lifting, which causes precipitation to fall more readily in Watauga County than in lowland areas to the east. Summers can be very warm, with temperatures commonly in the 80s and on a rare occasion in the 90s. Snow usually starts in November, and there can be snow falls in April, although this is not usual. Windy conditions tend to be amplified across the county due to the rugged terrain and high elevation.

Because of the cold weather in Watauga County, the area is home to several ski resorts. Among them is Appalachian Ski Mountain.

Transportation 
Watauga county, like most of the high country, has no Interstate. Most of the county is crossed by mountain roads, maintained by the state and county. Downtown Boone, adjacent to Appalachian State University, is very walkable.

Major highways

Airport 
No commercial airports or passenger train depots are nearby. AMTRAK serves High Point and Winston-Salem in the nearby Piedmont area, and Piedmont Authority for Regional Transportation (PART) bus provides connecting shuttle service to Watauga County. A helipad is in service at the Watauga Medical Center. A small general aviation airstrip (FAA Identifier: NC14) is located in Boone. Commercial airline passengers typically utilize the airports at Charlotte, Greensboro, and Raleigh-Durham in North Carolina, or Tri-Cities in Tennessee.

Public Transportation 
There is a public transport system in Boone provided by Appalcart that services the downtown and some outlying areas, with special routes to rural areas and intercity transit routes to Wilkes, Winston-Salem, Greensboro, Lenoir, Hickory, Lincolnton, Gastonia and Charlotte for a small fee.

Demographics

2020 census

As of the 2020 United States census, there were 54,086 people, 21,077 households, and 11,452 families residing in the county.

2000 census
As of the census of 2000, there were 42,695 people, 16,540 households, and 9,411 families residing in the county. The population density was 137 people per square mile (53/km2). There were 23,155 housing units at an average density of 74 per square mile (29/km2). The racial makeup of the county was 96.45% White, 1.59% Black or African American, 0.25% Native American, 0.59% Asian, 0.04% Pacific Islander, 0.45% from other races, and 0.62% from two or more races. 1.46% of the population were Hispanics or Latinos of any race.

According to the 2000 Census the largest self-reported ancestry groups in Watauga County were: English (25.1%), German (22.5%) and Irish (13.3%).
Most of those claiming Irish ancestry in Watauga county are actually of Scots-Irish/Ulster-Scots Protestant background and not Irish Catholics.

There were 16,540 households, out of which 23.20% had children under the age of 18 living with them, 47.40% were married couples living together, 6.80% had a female householder with no husband present, and 43.10% were non-families. 28.60% of all households were made up of individuals, and 8.00% had someone living alone who was 65 years of age or older. The average household size was 2.26 and the average family size was 2.80.

The age distribution is 16.30% under the age of 18, 27.80% from 18 to 24, 23.40% from 25 to 44, 21.50% from 45 to 64, and 11.00% who were 65 years of age or older. The median age was 30 years. The overall age distribution and median age are greatly affected by the presence of Appalachian State University in Boone. For every 100 females there are 99.30 males. For every 100 females age 18 and over, there were 98.20 males.

The median income for a household in the county was $32,611, and the median income for a family was $45,508. Males had a median income of $29,135 versus $22,006 for females. The per capita income for the county was $17,258. About 7.20% of families and 17.90% of the population were below the poverty line, including 11.50% of those under age 18 and 10.60% of those age 65 or over.

Government, public safety, and politics

Government
Watauga County is governed by an elected Board of Commissioners who provide administration policy for the appointed County Manager.

Watauga County is a member of the regional High Country Council of Governments.

Public safety

County sheriff and municipal police
The Sheriff's Office provides court protection, jail management, and protection of all county owned facilities for all of Watauga County and patrol and detective services for the unincorporated areas of the county. The towns of Boone, Beech Mountain, Blowing Rock, and Seven Devils have municipal police departments.

Fire protection and emergency services
Fire protection is provided by 13 fire departments in Watauga County including Beaver Dam, Boone, Beech Mountain, Cove Creek, Deep Gap, Foscoe, Meat Camp, Shawneehaw, Stewart, Simmons, Todd, and Zionville. The Emergency Management Office coordinates resources for emergency services.

Politics
Historically, Watauga's strong Unionist sympathies – though not as strong as North Carolina highland-mountain counties like Avery and Mitchell, or counties with Quaker, antislavery histories like Yadkin – meant the county voted mainly Republican during the Solid South Democrat era, except in Presidential landslides. The only Democrats to gain an absolute majority of the county's vote in the 20th century were Franklin Roosevelt in 1932 and 1936, and by a very narrow margin, Lyndon B. Johnson in 1964, while Woodrow Wilson in 1912 and Bill Clinton in 1992 obtained pluralities in three-cornered contests. The growth of Appalachian State University, with its predominantly left-leaning electorate, has strengthened the Democratic Party's standing and it carried the county in 2008, 2016 and 2020. The county has also proved favorable for Libertarians, with Watauga being Gary Johnson's best county in all of North Carolina in both his 2012 and 2016 campaigns.

Economy
Some notable examples of the counties economy are:
 The county produces heavy amounts of Fraser fir Christmas trees.
 The growth of produce was once a mainstay in the agricultural economy of the county. Cabbage was once widely grown, so much so, that a sauerkraut plant was once located in Boone. The plant has long been closed. Boone Creek, the main creek that runs through Boone and the Appalachian State University campus is still nicknamed Kraut Creek since it is said that the creek used to smell of sauerkraut juice coming out of the plant.
 The Watauga County Farmers' Market has been operating in Boone since 1974.

Education

K-8 schools
 Valle Crucis
 Blowing Rock
 Parkway
 Hardin Park
 Green Valley
 Bethel
 Cove Creek
 Mabel
 Two Rivers Community School
 Grace Academy
 Mountain Pathways Montessori School

High school
 Watauga High

Colleges and universities
 Appalachian State University. Appalachian State is part of the University of North Carolina System and enrolls more than 19,000 students.
 Caldwell Community College & Technical Institute - satellite campus

Communities

Towns
 Beech Mountain
 Blowing Rock
 Boone (county seat and largest town)
 Seven Devils

Unincorporated communities

 Aho
 Bamboo
 Cove Creek
 Deep Gap
 Foscoe
 Matney
 Meat Camp
 Sherwood
 Silverstone
 Sugar Grove
 Todd
 Valle Crucis
 Vilas
 Zionville

Former communities 

 Shulls Mill

Townships

 Bald Mountain
 Beaverdam
 Bethel
 Blowing Rock
 Blue Ridge
 Boone
 Brushy Fork
 Cove Creek
 Deep Gap
 Meat Camp
 New River
 North Fork
 Shawneehaw
 Stony Fork
 Todd

See also
 List of North Carolina counties
 National Register of Historic Places listings in Watauga County, North Carolina
 North Carolina State Parks
 National Park Service
 List of national forests of the United States

References

Further reading
 John Preston Arthur, A History of Watauga County, North Carolina: With Sketches of Prominent Families. Richmond, VA: Everett Waddey Co., 1915.
 Michael C. Hardy, A Short History of Watauga County. Winston-Salem, NC: John F. Blair, Publisher, 2008.
 Daniel J. Whitener, History of Watauga County: Souvenir of Watauga Centennial. Boone, NC: n.p., 1949.

External links

 
 

 
Counties of Appalachia
1849 establishments in North Carolina
Populated places established in 1849